Mustapha Yatabaré (born 26 January 1986) is a professional footballer who plays as a forward for Süper Lig club Sivasspor. Born in France, he represents Mali at international level.

Club career
Yatabaré was born in the French town of Beauvais, and began his career at his hometown club AS Beauvais. He stayed at the club until 2005, before signing for Amiens SC, to be part of the youth system. In 2006, he joined Championnat National side Villemomble Sports, scoring eight goals in 25 appearances, before earning a move to Ligue 2 side Clermont Foot in 2008.

Boulogne
Yatabaré moved to Ligue 1 side US Boulogne in January 2010. They were relegated at the end of the season.

Guingamp
During the summer of 2011, Yatabaré moved to the Ligue 2 side En Avant de Guingamp. He did not score in his first season.

At the beginning of the 2012–13 season, he scored eight goals within the ten first games, including successive goals from the sixth to the tenth game. He finished that season as the Ligue 2 top scorer, with 23 goals, and contributed six assists. His goal-scoring exploits helped earn the Briton club promotion back into Ligue 1 after two years in the second division.

Yatabaré scored his first goal of the 2013–14 Ligue 1 season on the opening day of the campaign, but it came in a losing effort as Guingamp fell 3–1 to Marseille. He scored his sixth league goal on 25 January 2014 in Guingamp's 1–1 draw with reigning champions PSG.

In the quarter-finals of the Coupe de France on 26 March 2014, Yatabaré scored both goals in Guingamp's 2–0 victory over AS Cannes.  On 16 April, Yatabaré scored twice against AS Monaco in the semi-finals of the Coupe de France as Guingamp won 3–1 in extra time to reach the final. In the final on 3 May, Yatabaré scored in the first minute of the second half, as Guingamp won 2–0 against Rennes. He headed in a cross from Steeven Langil for his eighth goal of the Coupe de France campaign, securing Guingamp's second Coupe de France championship.

On 2 August 2014, in the Trophée des Champions against Paris Saint-Germain at the Workers Stadium in Beijing, Yatabaré took a penalty in the 32nd minute after Claudio Beauvue had been fouled by Marquinhos. It was saved by Salvatore Sirigu and Guingamp lost 2–0.

Trabzonspor
On 1 September 2014, Yatabaré signed for Süper Lig side Trabzonspor on a three-year deal. The transfer fee paid to Guingamp was reported as €2.5 million.

Montpellier
After one season in Turkey, Yatabaré signed for Ligue 1 side Montpellier on a season-long loan deal, while Montpellier was given an option to sign him permanently.

Sivasspor
On 24 July 2019, Yatabaré left Konyaspor and signed a two-year contract with fellow Süper Lig club Sivasspor.

International career
In November 2008, Yatabaré earned himself a call-up to the Mali national football team, following his impressive club displays. He made his international debut on 19 November 2008 against Algeria in Rouen, with the score finishing 1–1. On 10 January 2010, in the opening game of the 2010 African Cup of Nations, he scored a dramatic equaliser, as Mali came from 0–4 down to draw 4–4 with Angola. He also made the squad for the 2012 tournament, helping the team reach the semi-finals and third place.

Personal life
Yatabaré was born in France to a Malian father and Senegalese mother. His younger brother, Sambou, is also a professional footballer.

Career statistics

Club

International
Scores and results list Mali's goal tally first.

Honours
Guingamp
 Coupe de France: 2013–14

Sivasspor
 Turkish Cup: 2021–22

Mali
Africa Cup of Nations bronze: 2012

Individual
 Ligue 2 UNFP Team of the Year: 2012–13
 Ligue 2 Top scorer: 2012–13

References

External links
 Profile at Foot Mercato
 
 Profile at Sport 24
 Interview with Yatabaré 
 
 

1986 births
Living people
Sportspeople from Beauvais
Footballers from Hauts-de-France
Malian footballers
Mali international footballers
French footballers
Malian people of Senegalese descent
French sportspeople of Malian descent
French sportspeople of Senegalese descent
Association football forwards
Clermont Foot players
AS Beauvais Oise players
Amiens SC players
US Boulogne players
En Avant Guingamp players
Konyaspor footballers
Trabzonspor footballers
Montpellier HSC players
Kardemir Karabükspor footballers
Sivasspor footballers
Ligue 1 players
Ligue 2 players
Süper Lig players
2010 Africa Cup of Nations players
2012 Africa Cup of Nations players
Malian expatriate footballers
French expatriate footballers
Expatriate footballers in Turkey
Malian expatriate sportspeople in Turkey
French expatriate sportspeople in Turkey
2015 Africa Cup of Nations players
2017 Africa Cup of Nations players